is a Japanese football player. He plays for Grulla Morioka.

Career
Kohei Imazeki joined J3 League club Grulla Morioka in 2017.

Club statistics
Updated to 22 February 2018.

References

External links

Profile at Grulla Morioka

1994 births
Living people
Toin University of Yokohama alumni
Association football people from Chiba Prefecture
Japanese footballers
J3 League players
Iwate Grulla Morioka players
Association football forwards